James Patrick Maher (born 27 February 1974) is an Australian former cricketer, who played One Day Internationals. He is "an attractive left-handed batsman with a clumping cover-drive".

Maher competed in the Gladiator Team Sports Challenge in 1995.

Domestic career
The following two seasons were a prolific pair for Maher playing for Queensland, a time which included a period at Glamorgan. In 2001–02, he became the first batsman to reach 1000 runs in the Pura Cup.

On 25 February 2007, Maher was named Man of the Match in the Ford Rangers Cup Final against the Victorian Bushrangers after making 108 from 133 balls. The Queensland Bulls went on to win the match by 21 runs. It was the third time that he had scored a century for Queensland in a One Day domestic final.

He retired from all types of cricket at the end of the Australian 2007–08 domestic season. Soon afterwards, he joined the Zee Telefilms' rebel Indian Cricket League, playing for the Hyderabad Heroes as an opening batsman.

Having spent two season at Durham Maher played for Glamorgan in 2007 after supporters funded the signing.

International career
He was first selected to play for Australia in two one-day matches in 1997–98, due to illness and injury respectively to Mark Waugh and Steve Waugh, but his performances were unspectacular.

He came back into the international fold in 2002, after the Waugh brothers were sacked following an ODI season in which Australia failed to make the finals of the triangular ODI series. He responded with a steady innings of 95 against South Africa. He was included in the Australian ODI squad as a spare batsman and as a fill-in wicketkeeper for the next few seasons, including the 2003 Cricket World Cup, but never managed to obtain a regular place in the side.

Controversy
On 11 February 2007 Maher was criticised by South Australian cricket captain Darren Lehmann for not declaring to make a game of their Pura Cup match at the Gabba. Lehmann said he thought he was playing Tasmania referring to Tasmania's reliance on final day run chases.

Maher caused controversy in 1995 following Queensland's Sheffield Shield win over South Australia, when he said during a television interview "I'm as full as a coon's Valiant". Indigenous Australians criticised Maher for his statement and its racial undertone. Maher later publicly apologised over the statement.

References

External links
 

1974 births
Australia One Day International cricketers
Glamorgan cricketers
Living people
Queensland cricketers
Queensland cricket captains
Durham cricketers
ICL World XI cricketers
Hyderabad Heroes cricketers
People from Innisfail, Queensland
Australian cricketers
Cricketers from Queensland
Wicket-keepers